Love on the Spectrum is an Australian reality television show that follows people on the autism spectrum as they explore the dating world. The show is produced by Northern Pictures for the ABC TV, and currently available to stream on ABC iview and Netflix.

The show is co-created by Cian O'Clery, who got the idea for the series after working on Employable Me about people with different disabilities trying to find employment.

Release 
Love on the Spectrum first aired on the ABC in November 2019. In July 2020, it was released on Netflix to other territories. A second season was confirmed in September 2020 and premiered on 18 May 2021.

Cast

Reception 

The show has received positive reviews from critics. It was awarded 4 out 5 stars by Rebecca Nicholson of The Guardian, saying that "at its best, this show is a compassionate, human celebration of difference, and of love." Brett White of Decider recommended for viewers to stream the show, observing that "Love on the Spectrum is unlike any Netflix reality dating show you've seen before, in the best way." Alison Foreman of Mashable gave the show a positive review, saying that "Love on the Spectrum is an affecting show that paints telling portraits of human connection that are so lovely, so moving, and so wholly satisfying, it's hard to imagine reality dating being done any other way", while Brian Lowry of CNN Entertainment said that the show "exhibits empathy toward the featured players without condescending toward them, and quickly bridges any cultural barriers in a broadly universal manner." In his review of the series, Daniel Hart of Ready Steady Cut was also positive, concluding that "a reality series that helps to dispel some of the stigma surrounding autism is particularly welcome." Although Michael Phillips of the Chicago Tribune was somewhat more critical of certain parts of the series, he nevertheless observed that "Unlike Tiger King or The Bachelor, or certain real-life political reality shows that lost touch with the real world a long time ago, Love on the Spectrum is about empathy. And about something more interesting than contempt."

Autistic reviewers generally liked the show but questioned aspects such as editing choices, focusing on parental  reactions and the neurotypical coaching, that preferenced neurotypical perspectives and infantalised the neurodivergent cast members. Sara Luterman from Spectrum said "The show is also riddled with bad advice and is frequently infantilizing. There are more interviews with parents than with the people the show is ostensibly about... The therapy and assistance offered to the young people featured on the show is similarly out of touch."
Sarah Kurchak from Time asked: "Is the score a bit too cutesy for a show about adults and dating? Would the close-ups on potentially eccentric clothing choices have happened if their subjects were neurotypical? Were the introductions that listed their subjects' "quirky" likes and dislikes genuinely informative or infantilizing?"
Joseph Stanichar from Paste said "Love on the Spectrum isn't perfect, especially in its first season... some of the questions posed seem inappropriate or infantilizing, even down to the tone of voice, and the music is occasionally too cutesy for adults going on dates." 

The second series reduced the role of the neurotypical relationship coach and expanded the depiction of the social lives of the main cast members with them discussing their dating with peers in a more age appropriate way.

American version 
An American version of the show, titled Love on the Spectrum U.S. premiered on May 18, 2022 on Netflix. It is also produced by Northern Pictures with Karina Holden and Cian O'Clery as executive producers. The series was renewed for a second season in September 2022.

See also 
 Employable Me (Australian TV series)
 Autism in Love
 The Undateables

References

External links
 
 
 
 
 

2019 Australian television series debuts
Australian Broadcasting Corporation original programming
2010s Australian reality television series
2020s Australian reality television series
Autism in television
English-language television shows
Primetime Emmy Award-winning television series